The Chuncheon International Marathon is an annual marathon race which is held in late October in the city of Chuncheon, South Korea. First held in 1946, it is the second oldest marathon in the country after the Seoul International Marathon. Sponsored by The Chosun Ilbo, a major daily newspaper in South Korea, the race is one of two in the country which holds IAAF Silver Label status, along with Gyeongju International Marathon.

History

The 1936 Summer Olympics saw two Koreans win Olympic medals: Sohn Kee-chung took the gold while Nam Sung-yong was the bronze medallist. Both runners had competed in the colours of Japan, as the competition took place when Korea was part of the Japanese empire. When Japan was defeated in World War II, Korea was liberated and the first "Chosun Ilbo Shortened Marathon" was held the following year, building upon the newly free country's running tradition. Suh Yun-bok, a sports coach at Anyang Technical College, won the first race and later took victory at the Boston Marathon. The race was extended to the marathon distance for the next year and the event was held on the eleventh anniversary of Sohn's Olympic win.

The race was not held from 1950 to 1953 due to the Korean War, but the annual competition has been uninterrupted since then. Marathon running became less popular in Korea in the 1960–70s and it was not until the 1980s that there was a resurgence of interest in the event, which saw women competing in the programme for the first time. Improving course times eventually resulted in Kim Wan-Ki's South Korean record run of 2:11:02 to win in 1991. The national race turned into an international one in 1995 and top runners from Kenya and Japan became frequent participants. The 1996 event hosted the Asian Marathon Championship race.

Course and records

The course overall is a relatively flat one, with small uphill and downhill sections coming around the 5-kilometre and 30-kilometre marks. The looped course starts near the city centre on the east bank and heads south, following the waterfront. It turns northwards at the 8 km mark as it reaches the city suburbs and traces along the west side of the river for a 20 km stretch. The course then crosses the river and heads back towards the finishing point in down-town Chuncheon.

Kim Wan-Ki's 1991 national and course record lasted only three years as Lee Bong-Ju dipped under the two hours, ten minutes mark with a run of 2:09:59. Moses Tanui became the first Kenyan winner in 1997 and knocked almost a minute off the record. This mark stood for thirteen years, at which point another Kenyan (Benjamin Kiptoo Kolum) took over a minute more off that time for the current men's course best of 2:07:54. That mark was beaten the following year by Stanley Biwott, who went 51 seconds faster. The women's record for the course is Kwon Eun-ju's long-standing time of 2:26:12, which is also a South Korean record.

Past winners

National era
Not much is known of the early winners of the race. Suh Yun-bok won the first race in a time of 1:29:24 on a shortened course estimated to have been around 25 km in length. A university student, Hong Jong-Oh, won the second race, beating a field of 50 runners to complete Chuncheon's first true marathon in a time of 2:57:20. The next documented winner came from after the Korean War, as Lee Chang-Hoon won a shorter 20 km race in 1957. The next known winners after this come from the race's period of growth in the 1980s: Kim Won-Tak won in 1985 in around two hours seventeen minutes, while Kim Jae-Ryong took the 1987 race in a time around three minutes faster than that.

Key:

International era

Key:

References

List of winners
Chosunilbo Chunchon Marathon. Association of Road Racing Statisticians (2009-12-27). Retrieved on 2010-10-26.

External links
Official website

Chuncheon
Recurring sporting events established in 1946
Marathons in South Korea
Autumn events in South Korea